Hinduism is a minority religion in the United States of America, ranking fourth-largest after Christianity, Judaism, and Islam, and constituting 1% of the population. The vast majority of American Hindus are immigrants from South Asia (mainly India, some from Nepal, Sri Lanka, and Bangladesh, and a minority from Bhutan, Maldives, Afghanistan, and Pakistan). There are also Hindus from Southeast Asia (mainly Singapore, Malaysia, Myanmar, Indonesia (especially Bali and Java), Canada, the Caribbean (mainly Trinidad and Tobago, Guyana, Suriname, and Jamaica), Oceania (mainly Fiji, Australia, and New Zealand), Africa (mainly Mauritius, South Africa, Kenya, Tanzania, Uganda, Nigeria, Réunion, and Seychelles), Europe (mainly United Kingdom, Netherlands, Germany, Italy, Switzerland, and France), and the Middle East (mainly the Gulf countries), and other countries and their descendants. Additionally, the United States has number of converts to Hinduism. There are also about 900 ethnic Cham people from Vietnam, one of the few remaining non-Indic Hindus in the world, living in America, 55% of whom are Hindus.

While there were isolated sojourns by Hindus in the United States during the 19th century, Hindu presence in the United States was extremely limited until the passage of the Immigration and Nationality Act of 1965.

Hindu-Americans hold the highest levels of educational attainment among all religious communities in the United States. This is mostly due to strong US immigration policies that favor educated and highly skilled migrants. Many concepts of Hinduism, such as meditation, karma, ayurveda, reincarnation, and yoga, have entered into mainstream American vernacular. According to Pew Forum on Religion and Public Life survey of 2009, 24% of Americans believe in reincarnation, a core concept of Hinduism. Furthermore, the Hindu values of vegetarianism and ahimsa are gaining in popularity. In September 2021, the State of New Jersey aligned with the World Hindu Council to declare October as Hindu Heritage Month. Om is a widely chanted mantra across the United States, particularly among millennials and those who practice yoga and subscribe to the New Age philosophy.

Demographics
The United States Department of State's 2004 Religious Freedom Report found some 1.5 million adherents of Hinduism, corresponding to 0.50% of the total population. The Hindu population of USA is the world's eighth-largest; 10% of Asian Americans who together account for 5.8% of US population, are followers of the Hindu faith.

Most Hindus in America are immigrants (87%) and 9% are the children of immigrants and 10% of the Hindus are converts. In the 1990s, Buddhist Bhutan expelled or forced to leave most of its Hindu population, one-fifth of the country's population, demanding conformity in religion. More than 90,000 Hindu-Bhutanese refugees have been resettled in the United States.

Many of the Afghan Hindus have also settled in United States with their family, mainly after Soviet–Afghan War and rise of Taliban. Many of them immigrated to United States due to the discrimination faced by them in their homeland. Many of them reflects and influence the Culture of Afghanistan in United States.

According to the Association of Statisticians of American Religious Bodies newsletter published March 2017, Hindus were the largest minority religion in 92 counties out of the 3143 counties in the country. In September 2021, the State of New Jersey aligned with the World Hindu Council to declare October as Hindu Heritage Month.

Although Hinduism is practiced mainly by immigrants from India and Nepal, a sizable amount of Hindus in United States were converts to Hinduism. According to the Pew research estimates, 9% of the Hindus in United States belong to a non-Asian ethnicity – 4% of the Hindus in United States were White, 2% were Black, 1% Latino and 2% Mixed. Converts to Hinduism include Hollywood actress Julia Roberts, actor Russell Brand etc.

Contemporary status and Public Opinion

American Hindus have the highest rates of educational attainment and highest rate of household income among all religious communities, and the lowest divorce rates. This is mostly due to strong US immigration policies that favor educated and highly skilled migrants only.

According to the 2008 Pew Research, Of all the America adults who said they were raised as Hindus, 80 percent continued to adhere to Hinduism which is the highest retention rate for any religion in America.

Public opinions of Hindus
Hindus also have relatively high acceptance of homosexuality. 71% of the Hindus in the United States believe that homosexuality should be accepted, which is higher than the general public which is 62%. About 68% of the Hindus supported same-sex marriage, while that of general public is 53%. Hindus in the United States also showed high support for abortion. About 68% of the Hindus supported abortion. About 69% of the Hindus supported strict laws and regulation for the protection of environment and nature.

According to the Pew Research Center, only 15% of the Americans identified the Vedas as a Hindu religious text. Roughly half of Americans knew that yoga has roots in Hinduism. On the same survey when respondents were asked to rate how warmly they see religious groups on a "feeling thermometer"; Hindus were below Jews, Catholics, and Evangelical Christians; but were above Atheists, and Muslims. The Survey noted that on a scale of 0–100, Hindus had a thermometer reading at 55 compared to 63 for Jews, and Muslims at 49.

Religiosity
According to a 2014 Pew Research survey, 88% of the American Hindu population believed in God (versus 89% of adults overall). However, only 26% believed that religion is very important in their life. About 51% of the Hindu population reported praying daily.

Though 88% of Hindus believe in God, that is low compared to the 99% of Evangelical Protestants, 96% of Catholics, 99% of Jehovah's Witnesses, etc.

History

Anandibai Joshi is believed to be the first Hindu woman to set foot on American soil, arriving in New York in June 1883 at the age of 19. She graduated with an MD from the Women's Medical College of Pennsylvania on March 11, 1886, becoming the first female of South Asian origin to graduate with a degree in Western medicine from the United States. Joshi returned to India in late 1886 but died within months of her return.

One of the first major discussions of Hinduism in the United States was Swami Vivekananda's address to the World's Parliament of Religions in Chicago in 1893. He spent two years in the United States, and lectured in several cities including Detroit, Boston, and New York. In 1902 Swami Rama Tirtha visited the US for about two years lecturing on the philosophy of Vedanta. In 1920 Paramahansa Yogananda was India's delegate at the International Congress of Religious Liberals held in Boston.

Prior to 1965, Hindu immigration to the United States was minuscule and isolated, with fewer than fifty thousand Indians immigrating before 1965. It is worth noting that although most of these immigrants were Punjabi Sikhs, they were incorrectly referred to as "Hindoo" by many Americans, as well as in some official immigration documents. The Bellingham Riots in Bellingham, Washington on September 5, 1907, epitomized the low tolerance in the United States for Indians and Hindus. In the 1923 case United States v. Bhagat Singh Thind, the Supreme Court ruled that Thind and other South Asians were not "free white persons" according to a 1790 federal law that stated that only white immigrants could apply for naturalized citizenship. The Immigration Act of 1924 prohibited the immigration of Asians such as Middle Easterners and Indians. This further prevented Hindus from immigrating to the United States. Despite such events, some people, including professionals, stayed and worked until the Immigration and Nationality Services (INS) Act of 1965 was passed. This opened the doors to Hindu immigrants who wished to work and start families in the United States. It included Hindu preachers as well, who spread awareness of the religion among the people who had little or no contact with it.

Also during the 1960s, Hindu teachers found resonance in the US counter-culture, leading to the formation of a number of Neo-Hindu movements such as the International Society for Krishna Consciousness founded by Swami Prabhupada. People involved in the counter-culture such as Ram Dass, George Harrison, and Allen Ginsberg were influential in the spread of Hinduism in the United States. Ram Dass was a Harvard professor known as Richard Alpert and after being fired from Harvard was receiving a lot of media coverage. He traveled to India and studied under Neem Karoli Baba and came back to the west as a Hindu teacher and changed his name to Ram Dass which means servant of Rama (one of the Hindu gods). A student of Ram Dass, Jeffery Kagel, devoted his life to Hinduism in the sixties and is now making many CDs chanting the sacred mantras or spiritual verses. He has been very successful and is considered the rock star of yoga. George Harrison was a member of The Beatles which in its peak of popularity was receiving more media coverage than any other band in the world. He became a devotee of Swami Prabhupada. George Harrison started to record songs with the words "Hari Krishna" in the lyrics and was widely responsible for popularizing Hinduism in America with the younger generation of the time. Allen Ginsberg, the author of Howl, became a figure in the sixties that was also heavily involved with Hinduism and it was said that he chanted "Om" at The Human Be-in of 1967 for hours on end. Other influential Indians of Hindu faith are Mata Amritanandamayi, Chinmoy and Maharishi Mahesh Yogi.

A joint session of the United States Congress was opened with a prayer in Sanskrit (with some Hindi and English added), read by Venkatachalapathi Samudrala, in September 2000, to honor the visit of Indian Prime Minister Atal Bihari Vajpayee. The historic gesture was an initiative by Ohio Congressman Sherrod Brown who requested the US Congress House Chaplain to invite the Hindu priest from the Shiva Vishnu Hindu Temple in Parma, Ohio. Another Hindu prayer was read in the United States Senate on July 12, 2007, by Rajan Zed, a Hindu chaplain from Nevada. His prayer was interrupted by a couple and their daughter who claimed to be "Christian patriots", which prompted a criticism of candidates in the upcoming presidential election for not criticizing the remarks. In October 2009, President Barack Obama lit a ceremonial Diwali lamp at the White House to symbolize victory of light over darkness. In April 2009, President Obama appointed the first Hindu American, Anju Bhargava, a management consultant and pioneer community builder, to serve as a member of his inaugural Advisory Council on Faith Based and Neighborhood Partnership. In collaboration with the White House Hindu American Seva Communities was formed to bring the Hindu seva voices to the forefront in the public arena and to bridge the gap between US government and Hindu and Dharmic people and places of worship.

 92,323 exiled Bhutanese refugees have been resettled in the USA since 2008. Hinduism is the major religion of Bhutanese who resettle in the USA.

Western Influence
Hindu Americans as well as Hindu Immigrants can be seen adapting their practice and places of worship in accordance with the world around them. Hindu temples in the United States tend to house more than one deity corresponding with a different tradition, unlike those in India which tend to house deities from a single tradition. Not only has yoga entered the American vernacular, but its meaning has shifted. While Hindus in the United States may refer to the practice as a form of meditation that has different forms (i.e. karma yoga, bhakti yoga, kriya yoga), it is used in reference to the physical aspect of the word.

Hindu temples

The Vedanta Society was responsible for building the earliest temples in the United States starting in 1905, with the Old Temple in San Francisco, but they were not considered formal temples. The earliest traditional Mandir in the United States is Shiva Kartikeya Temple in Concord, California and was built in 1957 known as Palanisamy Temple, it is one of the few temples that is run by the public by elected members. The Maha Vallabha Ganapathi Devastanam owned by the Hindu Temple Society of North America in Flushing, New York City was consecrated on July 4, 1977. This temple recently underwent significant expansion and renovation.

Today there are over 1450 Hindu Temples across the United States, spread across the country, with a majority of them situated on the east coast centered around the New York region which alone has over 1135 temples the next largest number being in Texas with 128 Temples and Massachusetts with 127 temples.

Other prominent temples include the Malibu Hindu Temple, built-in 1981 and located in Calabasas, is owned and operated by the Hindu Temple Society of Southern California. The temple is near Malibu, California. Apart from these, Swaminarayan temples exist in several cities across the country with a sizable following.

The Sri Ganesha Temple of Alaska in Anchorage is the northernmost Hindu temple in the world.

The oldest Hindu Temple in Texas is the Shree Raseshwari Radha Rani temple at Radha Madhav Dham, Austin. The temple, established by Jagadguru Shree Kripaluji Maharaj is one of the largest Hindu Temple complexes in the Western Hemisphere, and the largest in North America.

In Tampa, South Florida, the Sri Vishnu Temple was consecrated in November 2001.

Parashakthi Temple in Pontiac, Michigan is a tirtha peetham in the west for Goddess "Shakthi" referred to as the "Great Divine Mother" in Hinduism. The Temple was envisioned by Dr. G Krishna Kumar in a deep meditative kundalini experience of "Adi Shakthi" in 1994.

Akshardham in Robbinsville, New Jersey is one of the largest stone Hindu temples in the United States.

The Indian American Cultural Center opened on March 9, 2002, in Merrillville, Northwest Indiana. It was in 2010 on June 18 that the temple was finalized and opened, The Bharatiya Temple of Northwest Indiana. This temple is adjacent to the Cultural Center. In the native way of Hinduism, one would never see different sectarian groups worship in one temple. The Bharatiya Temple is unique in its own way by allowing different sectarian groups to worship together. The Bharatiya Temple has four different Hindu groups as well as a Jain group.

Political Involvement 

A Hindu Military Chaplaincy was launched in May 2011; Army Captain Pratima Dharm become the first Hindu to serve as a U.S. military chaplain.

Tulsi Gabbard became the first-ever Hindu to be elected to the US Congress in 2012; she is a Hawaiian of Samoan and European descent, the daughter of a Roman Catholic father and a Hindu mother. Later, in 2016 three more Hindus were elected to Congress: Raja Krishnamoorthi, Pramila Jayapal and Ro Khanna (Rohit Khanna)all of Indian descent. American Hindus are now the third-largest Religious Group in Congress with four members. Among the lawmakers declining to state their religious affiliations were Indian-American Pramila Jayapal elected to the House of Representatives; since her mother is a Hindu, the Hindu American Foundation suggests that Jayapal is also Hindu. In 2019 Padma Kuppa, an Indian politician from Troy Michigan joined the House of Representatives.

The American Hindu are considered as an important vote bank in the American Politics.

Activism
Several organizations have been made to combat discrimination against Hindus in the United States and make changes in the political scene. Some of these organizations include:
Hindus for Human Rights
Sadhana: Coalition of Progressive Hindus
CoHNA: Coalition of Hindus of North America

Hinduism in United States Territories

Guam
Hinduism is practiced by 0.1% of the population of Guam.

U.S Virgin Islands

According to the 2000 census, there were more than 400 Hindus in the United States Virgin Islands (0.4% of the population). According to the 2011 census, there are 528 Hindus in the U.S. Virgin Islands representing 1.9% of the population. The majority reside in the Tortola Island (454) followed by the Virgin Gorda Island (69). Tortola and Virgin Gorda are part of the British Virgin Islands, to which these statistics refer, so are not applicable here. The majority of them are Sindhi Hindus with some Gujaratis.

Puerto Rico
As of 2006, there were 3,482 Hindus in Puerto Rico making up 0.09% of the population, according to Religious Intelligence.

Discrimination

Temple desecration
In January 2019, Swaminarayan Temple in Kentucky was vandalized. They sprayed black paint on the deity and also sprayed 'Jesus is the only God' on the walls. The Christian cross was also spray painted on various walls. In February 2015, Hindu temples in Kent and the Seattle Metropolitan area were vandalized, and in April 2015, a Hindu temple in north Texas was vandalized with xenophobic images spray-painted on its walls. The Sri Venkateshwara temple in Pittsburgh was also vandalized and $15000 worth of jewelry was stolen.

In January 2023, the Shri Omkarnath Temple located in Brazos Valley, Texas was broken into by the burglars. The board member of temple, Srinivasa Sunkari said "There was a sense of invasion, that sense of loss of privacy when something like this happened to us". Hindu advocacy organizations like HinduPact and Hindu American Foundation demanded investigation in the issue.

Hindu prayers in Congress and State legislatures

Venkatachalapathi Samuldrala

The first Hindu opening prayer offered in the U.S. Congress was by Venkatachalapathi Samuldrala, a priest of Shiva Hindu Temple in Parma, Ohio. This prompted criticism from the Family Research Council (FRC), a conservative Christian group, who protested against it in conservative media, in turn generating responses from their opponents and leading to serious discussions over the role of legislative chaplains in a pluralist society.

Rajan Zed 

There was controversy over the prayer by Rajan Zed, a Hindu cleric, in United States Senate. It was instigated by the conservative Christian group American Family Association, which cited the loss of the "Judeo-Christian foundations" of the United States as a motive.

California textbook protest over Hindu history

A controversy in the US state of California concerning the portrayal of Hinduism in history textbooks began in 2005. The Texas-based Vedic Foundation and the American Hindu Education Foundation complained to California's Curriculum Commission, arguing that the coverage in sixth grade history textbooks of Indian history and Hinduism was biased against Hinduism. Points of contention included a textbook's portrayal of the caste system, the Indo-Aryan migration theory, and the status of women in Indian society.

See also

 Maharishi Vedic City, Iowa
 :Category:Converts to Hinduism
 Hindu American Foundation
 Hindu Temple Society of North America
 Hindu University of America
 Hinduism in Los Angeles
 Sanskrit studies
 Hinduism Today
 Persecution of Hindus
 Hinduism in the West Indies
 Indians in the New York City metropolitan area
 List of Hindu temples in the United States
 Hindu eschatology
 Hinduism in Vietnam
 Bhutanese refugees
 Micheal Altman

References

Further reading

External links

 
 
  at Google Maps
 
 
 
 Hindu American Foundation
 Behind Every Temple- USA

 
Neo-Vedanta
United States
Hinduism in North America
Religion in the United States by religion